Roger Tiegs (born 18 June 1972 in Umeå), better known by his stage name Infernus, is a Norwegian black metal musician and Satanist. He is the sole founding member and chief ideologist of the black metal band Gorgoroth, which was formed in 1992, as well as the founder and head of Forces of Satan Records. He is mainly a guitarist but has also participated as bassist, drummer and vocalist on several recordings released both by Gorgoroth and other bands.

Biography

The formation of Gorgoroth
Infernus founded the black metal band Gorgoroth in Sunnfjord in 1992 after making 'a pact with the Devil'. The first Gorgoroth demo, A Sorcery Written in Blood, was released in 1993, and this demo landed the band a record deal with French label Embassy Productions. The first full-length Gorgoroth album, Pentagram, was released in 1994. In the following years, the band experienced several line-up changes, with Infernus being the only original member to continue in the band. Joining members of black metal bands such as Ulver, Immortal, Enslaved and Molested, he also participated as bassist on Borknagar's self-titled debut album, which was released in 1996. After signing a deal with German label Malicious Records, Gorgoroth released the albums Antichrist in 1996 and Under the Sign of Hell in 1997, with Infernus responsible for all the music and also the majority of the lyrics, as well as doing both guitar and bass duties on the albums. These three first albums were the first steps towards fame in Norway, and the following albums resulted in Gorgoroth earning their reputation as one of the leading black metal bands in the world.

Gorgoroth tenure with Nuclear Blast
After the release of Under the Sign of Hell and a European headlining tour in 1997, Gorgoroth was signed by the major German metal label Nuclear Blast. Infernus wrote the majority of the first two Gorgoroth albums released on Nuclear Blast, Destroyer (1998) and Incipit Satan (2000). Guitarist Tormentor, who had joined the band in 1996, wrote the title tracks for these two albums, and Infernus and Tormentor also released an album and three limited editions of 7" vinyl in 1998 as a black metal side project called Desekrator, which included members of Enslaved and Old Funeral. After performing live with Gorgoroth on several festivals and tours both in Europe and South America, Infernus became one of the founding members of the black metal band Orcustus in 2002, a band consisting of members and ex-members of Gorgoroth, Gehenna and Enslaved. Twilight of the Idols - In Conspiracy with Satan, which was Gorgoroth's third release on Nuclear Blast, came out in 2003.

Allegations of rape
In 2003, Infernus was accused of raping a woman at an after-party. In the following trial, he was acquitted of rape, but was convicted of gross negligent rape and served four months in prison in winter 2006/2007.

Gorgoroth controversy in Kraków and transfer to Regain Records
On 1 February 2004 Infernus and Gorgoroth performed a controversial live gig in Kraków, Poland, which was meant to be released on DVD by Metal Mind Productions. Due to the satanic nature of the live show, the band and DVD producers were accused of breaking the Polish blasphemy laws. The tapes from the concert were confiscated by the Polish police for 4 years, but the concert was finally released on DVD in summer 2008, as Black Mass Krakow 2004. In 2005, Infernus and Tormentor (who had quit Gorgoroth in 2002) released a cover version of Von's "Satanic Blood", under the name Norwegian Evil. After leaving Nuclear Blast in 2004, Infernus and Gorgoroth signed on Swedish record label Regain Records, which released the next Gorgoroth album, Ad Majorem Sathanas Gloriam, in 2006.

Forces of Satan Records
On 6 June 2006 Infernus started his own record label, Forces of Satan Records, dedicated to only releasing albums by bands with a "clear-cut Satanic profile". The label's first release was the Gorgoroth live EP Bergen 1996, followed by albums by the Italian black metal band Black Flame, the Brazilian death metal band Ophiolatry, and the Serbian black metal band Triumfall.

Trademark of Gorgoroth band name and Quantos Possunt ad Satanitatem Trahunt
In March that year, Infernus announced that he had won the rights to the Gorgoroth band name in a dispute with Gaahl and King. According to Tiegs, City District Court delivered a verdict on the main question in the Gorgoroth trademark case, which took place at the end of January 2009. The court decided that King ov Hell's trademark registration No. 243365 of the band name Gorgoroth was not valid and was therefore to be deleted. The court stated that King ov Hell and Gaahl excluded themselves from the band Gorgoroth when they tried to fire Infernus in October 2007. The court further stated that Infernus cannot be excluded from Gorgoroth, unless he himself should decide to quit.

With the departure of Gaahl and King ov Hell from Gorgoroth, Infernus recruited drummer Tomas Asklund (Dissection) and bassist Bøddel (Obituary) as well as guitarist Tormentor and vocalist Pest into the band, and recorded and released the album Quantos Possunt Ad Satanitatem Trahunt in 2009.

Beliefs
Infernus is a theistic Satanist and as the founding member of Gorgoroth, has built the band on his philosophy and religion, proclaiming himself as 'Satan's Minister on Earth'. When asked in March 2009 about what he specifically practised, he described it as a Gnostic form of Satanism. In an interview conducted in March 2009 following the conclusion of the Gorgoroth name dispute with former colleagues Gaahl and King of Hell, he explicitly reaffirmed that he was 'the ideological backbone of Gorgoroth'. He has expressed opposition to the Church of Satan based on commercial frivolity, and when asked about this on a couple of occasions in 2009 he also said that he disagreed with their basic values:'Basically, because they reject a theist view upon being. I do not regard man as the center of the universe. These are my views and they are not the views of any humanist or so-called atheist.'

Gallery

Discography

References

External links
 Official Infernus MySpace profile on Myspace

1972 births
Living people
Norwegian heavy metal bass guitarists
Norwegian male bass guitarists
Norwegian black metal musicians
Norwegian rock bass guitarists
Norwegian rock guitarists
Norwegian Satanists
Norwegian songwriters
Musicians from Bergen
Gorgoroth members
Norwegian heavy metal guitarists
Norwegian multi-instrumentalists
Black metal guitarists
21st-century Norwegian bass guitarists